Tapan Chowdhury may refer to:

Tapan Chowdhury (businessman)
Tapan Chowdhury (singer)